Leuconitocris major is a species of beetle in the family Cerambycidae. It was described by Stephan von Breuning in 1956.

Subspecies
 Dirphya major major (Breuning, 1956)
 Dirphya major rhodesiana Breuning, 1972
 Dirphya major nigrotibialis (Lepesme & Breuning, 1953)

References

Leuconitocris
Beetles described in 1956